Doriopsilla elitae is a species of dorid nudibranch, a colourful sea slug, a shell-less marine gastropod mollusc in the family Dendrodorididae. This species of sea slug is described as having a yellow to orange color tone decorated with white spots. Located on the dorsal side are four large spots similar to those found on die.

Distribution
This species was described from St. Lucia, Caribbean Sea with additional specimens from Petit Nevis, Saint Vincent and the Grenadines.

References

Dendrodorididae
Gastropods described in 2008